The 2006 Pacific hurricane season was the first above-average season since 1994 which produced twenty-five tropical cyclones, with nineteen named storms, though most were rather weak and short-lived. Only eleven hurricanes formed and six major hurricanes. Following the inactivity of the previous seasons, forecasters predicted that season would be only slightly above active. It was also the first time since 2003 in which at least one cyclone of tropical storm intensity made landfall. The season officially began on May 15 in the East Pacific Ocean, and on June 1 in the Central Pacific; they ended on November 30. These dates conventionally delimit the period of each year when most tropical cyclones form in the Pacific basin. However, the formation of tropical cyclones is possible at any time of the year.

Seasonal activity began on May 27, when Tropical Storm Aletta formed off the southwest coast of Mexico. No storms formed in June, though the season became active in July when five named storms developed, including Hurricane Daniel which was the second strongest storm of the season, as well as Tropical Storm Emilia. During August, Hurricanes Ioke and John formed, as well as four other storms. The strongest storm of the season was Hurricane Ioke, which reached Category 5 status on the Saffir–Simpson scale in the central Pacific Ocean; Ioke passed near Johnston Atoll and later Wake Island, where it caused heavy damage but no deaths. The deadliest storm of the season was Hurricane John, which killed six people after striking the Baja California Peninsula, and the costliest storm was Hurricane Lane, which caused $203 million in damage in southwestern Mexico (2006 USD, $  USD). Damage across the basin reached $355.1 million (2006 USD), while 14 people were killed by the various storms.

Seasonal forecast 

On May 22, 2006, the National Oceanic and Atmospheric Administration's (NOAA) CPC (CPC) released their forecasts for the 2006 Atlantic and Pacific hurricane seasons. The Pacific season was expected to be hindered by the decades-long cycle that began in 1995, which generally increased wind shear across the basin. NOAA predicted a below-normal level of activity in the Eastern Pacific, with 12–16 named storms, of which 6–8 were expected to become hurricanes, and 1–3 expected to become major hurricanes. The Central Pacific Hurricane Center's area of responsibility was also expected to be below average, with only two to three tropical cyclones expected to form or cross into the area. They expected that neither El Niño nor La Niña would affect conditions significantly.

On May 15, the hurricane season began in the Eastern Pacific basin, which is the area of the northern Pacific Ocean east of 140°W. On June 1, the season began in the Central Pacific warning zone (between 140°W and the International Date Line); however, no storms occurred in the region until July.

Seasonal summary 

The accumulated cyclone energy (ACE) index for the 2006 Pacific hurricane season as calculated by Colorado State University using data from the National Hurricane Center was 156.9 units. Broadly speaking, ACE is a measure of the power of a tropical or subtropical storm multiplied by the length of time it existed. Therefore, a storm with a longer duration, such as Hurricane Ioke, which arrived with a total of 32.2250 units and then crossed to the Western Pacific, will have high values of ACE.

Overall, there were 19 tropical storms. In addition, 11 hurricanes developed. Furthermore, there were total of six major hurricanes, Category 3 or greater on the Saffir–Simpson hurricane wind scale. The season officially started on May 15 in the East Pacific Ocean, and on June 1 in the Central Pacific; they both ended on November 30. No tropical storms developed in June in the basin, which was unusual compared to the average of two storms forming during the month.

From 1966 to 2008, there have been only three other seasons in which a tropical storm did not form in June, these being 1969, 2004, 2007 seasons. After such an inactive month, the tropics became active in July when five named storms developed, including Hurricane Daniel which was the second strongest storm of the season. During August, Hurricanes Ioke and John formed, as well as four other storms. September was a relatively quiet month with two storms, of which one was Hurricane Lane.  By that time, however, El Niño conditions became established across the Pacific, which is known to enhance Pacific hurricane activity. Three storms developed in October, including Hurricane Paul. Tropical activity within the basin in November 2006 was the most active on record, based on the ACE Index. Three tropical cyclones formed, of which two became tropical storms; only one other season on record at the time, 1961, produced two tropical storms in the month of November. In addition, Mexico was struck by four tropical cyclones in 2006, none on the Atlantic coast and all along the Pacific coast. One hit Baja California Peninsula while the others made landfall on the mainland.

An extratropical storm persisted in the extreme northern central Pacific Ocean in late October. It drifted over unusually warm waters up to 3.6 °F (2 °C) above normal, and gradually developed convection near the center. The system also developed an eye and an eyewall. The cyclone tracked northeastward as it gradually weakened, and dissipated on November 4. NASA considered the cyclone to be a subtropical storm. However, as it formed outside of the territory of any monitoring organization, it was not named. Operationally, the United States Navy treated the system as a tropical disturbance, numbered 91C.

Systems

Tropical Storm Aletta

The first storm of the year had its genesis from a tropical wave that crossed Central America and entered the East Pacific on May 21. The system interacted with a trough near the Gulf of Tehuantepec, causing thunderstorms to increase. A large low-pressure area formed on May 25 south of Mexico, which organized slowly due to wind shear in the region. The nascent storm moved little, and the wind shear displaced the center west of the convection. Late on May 27, the NHC upgraded the depression to Tropical Storm Aletta. While named tropical cyclones in May are infrequent events, Aletta marked the seventh consecutive year to have a named cyclone form in May. The storm drifted for several days off the southern coast of Mexico. Increased wind shear and dry air caused weakening on May 29, and Aletta weakened into a tropical depression. Drifting westward, the system became a remnant low on May 31, and dissipated soon afterward.

The storm moved toward the Guerrero coast in southwestern Mexico, prompting the Mexican government to issue tropical storm watches between Punta Maldonado and Zihuatanejo. High winds knocked down trees and caused minor structural damage. In Zihuatanejo, a ship with nine people was rescued after being reported as lost, which may have been a result of high seas generated by Aletta.

Tropical Depression Two-E

On the day after Aletta dissipated, a new area of disturbed weather developed off the southwest Mexican coast. High shear slowed the development of the system, although it gained enough convection and organization to be classified as a tropical depression on June 3. The depression strengthened to near tropical storm status as it approached the coast of southwestern Mexico; however, shear persisted over the system and it weakened before dissipating on June 4.

Despite never becoming a named storm, heavy rain occurred, including a total of  measured in a 48‑hour period in Acapulco. Mudslides and flash flooding were reported, forcing 72 people from their homes. No deaths or serious damage was reported.

Hurricane Bud

A tropical wave exited the west coast of Africa on June 27, which reached the eastern Pacific on July 7. The system spawned a low-pressure area south of Mexico. Associated convection gradually became better organized, and the system organized into Tropical Depression Three-E early on July 11. Steered by a subtropical ridge over Mexico, the storm tracked west-northwestward for its entirety. Located over warm waters, the depression intensified into Tropical Storm Bud within six hours of its formation. The thunderstorms organized, with good outflow except to the east due to the presence of Tropical Storm Carlotta. On July 12, the NHC upgraded Bud to a hurricane, after an eye developed in the storm's center. Later on July 12, Bud was upgraded to a Category 2 hurricane on the Saffir–Simpson hurricane scale.

Early on July 13, Bud became a Category 3 hurricane, or a major hurricane. At that time, the well-defined eye was enclosed by a ring of deep thunderstorms. Bud encountered cooler waters and stable air, and a period of rapid weakening began. The eye became obscured, and core convective cloud tops began to warm, until much of the convection was lost on July 14, impeded by southeasterly wind shear. On July 15, Bud was downgraded to a tropical depression, and the next day it degenerated into a remnant low. The remnants of Bud produced light rainfall across Hawaii.

Hurricane Carlotta

A tropical wave exited Africa on June 30 and moved across the Atlantic Ocean without development. The large depression moved quickly to the west-northwest to the south of a ridge over northwestern Mexico, and its outer rainbands moved across the coast. The depression intensified into Tropical Storm Carlotta just six hours after forming.

An eye formed in the center, and the hurricane was briefly forecast to attain major hurricane status, or a Category 3 on the Saffir–Simpson scale. However, Carlotta weakened due to increased wind shear from Hurricane Bud to its west, and the eye and convection deteriorated. Carlotta briefly weakened to tropical storm status late on July 14, although a decrease in shear allowed it to reintensify into a hurricane. This was short-lived as the center moved into the area of cooler waters, and Carlotta again weakened to tropical storm status. Late on July 15, the circulation became separated from the convection, and Carlotta weakened to tropical depression status on July 16, and the next day generated into a remnant low.

Hurricane Daniel

On July 16, a tropical disturbance formed far to the south of the Baja California Peninsula and quickly increased in convective activity and organization, becoming a tropical depression. The system continued to organize and was designated as a tropical storm the next day. On July 18, Daniel attained hurricane status, and two days later underwent rapid intensification; it reached major hurricane status and was later upgraded further to Category 4 status on the Saffir–Simpson hurricane scale. The hurricane underwent eyewall replacement cycles, which are internal mechanisms that occur in most intense hurricanes. Daniel later became an annular hurricane, which allowed it to maintain Category 4 status for longer than it otherwise would have.

It crossed over into the Central Pacific early on July 24 and was predicted to affect Hawaii as a tropical storm; however, Daniel encountered weak steering currents in the open ocean, causing it to slow down considerably. It rapidly degenerated to a tropical depression on July 25, and the CPHC issued its last advisory on July 26 while the storm was still well to the east of Hawaii. Its remnants later moved across the Hawaiian islands, dropping heavy rainfall and causing flooding. West Wailuaiki on Maui recorded  in one day, which was the highest daily rainfall total from the hurricane.

Tropical Storm Emilia

The origins of Emilia were from a tropical wave that developed into a tropical depression on July 21, a short distance off the coast of Acapulco. It briefly weakened due to wind shear, although restrengthening occurred as the storm turned toward the Baja California peninsula. It weakened as it turned into cooler waters, first to tropical depression status on July 27 and then to a convective-less remnant low on July 28.

In southwestern Mexico, Emilia produced tropical storm force winds along the coastline. Rainfall in the southern portion of the Baja California peninsula caused minor flooding, and gusty winds caused damage to buildings and power lines. Moisture from Emilia reached the southwestern United States. Thunderstorms and rainfall occurred across Arizona, causing flooding. In southern California, the storm dropped light rainfall, which assisted firefighters in containing a wildfire.

Tropical Storm Fabio

A tropical wave crossed the west coast of Africa on July 15 and entered the Pacific on July 25. Six hours later, the depression was upgraded to Tropical Storm Fabio. Later, the storm began weakening due to increased wind shear and dry air. On August 3, Fabio deteriorated to tropical depression status, and later that day it degenerated into a remnant low-pressure area. The remnants continued westward, moving across Hawaii on August 7.

Although Fabio did not impact land, its remnants produced heavy rainfall in Hawaii. In a 24-hour period,  of rainfall was recorded at Glenwood on the island of Hawaii; this was the highest daily rainfall total for the month on the island. However, the heaviest precipitation fell on Mount Waiʻaleʻale on Kauai, where  fell in 24 hours; this total alone was greater than all other monthly rainfall totals in the state. The heavy rainfall flooded the Hanalei River, which forced the closure of the Kuhio Highway when a bridge was inundated. On Oahu, the rainfall caused ponding on roadways and flooding along streams. One flooded stream stranded 24 hikers along a trail, all of whom required rescue by helicopter.

Tropical Storm Gilma
On July 17, a tropical wave exited Africa and crossed the Atlantic without developing. On July 25 it entered the Eastern Pacific, gradually developing an area of organized convection. Despite marginally favorable upper-level winds, the system organized enough to be declared a tropical depression on August 1, several hundred miles southwest of Acapulco, Mexico. Initially, the depression tracked west-northwestward. Despite wind shear in the area, the depression was upgraded to Tropical Storm Gilma later on August 1. The wind shear prevented further strengthening or organization, and Gilma weakened to a tropical depression early on August 2. The depression turned westward, and Gilma degenerated into a remnant low by August 4.

Hurricane Hector

A tropical wave exited Africa on July 31, and after no development in the Atlantic, it crossed Central America into the northeastern Pacific Ocean on August 10. It moved west-northwestward, located south of a ridge that extended westward from northern Mexico westward into the Pacific. The depression quickly intensified into Tropical Storm Hector early on August 16. Hector was able to steadily strengthen, reaching hurricane status at 0600 UTC on August 17.

Hector remained a Category 2 hurricane for about 24 hours. Shortly thereafter, it encountered cooler waters and westerly shear, and Hector steadily weakened until becoming a tropical storm by August 20. Shortly thereafter, the storm reached a weakness in the subtropical ridge, which caused it to move slowly to the northwest. By August 21, deep convection was confined to the northeast portion of the circulation. The shear was not strong enough to completely weaken the tropical cyclone and Hector remained a tropical storm with  winds for about 24 hours. After the remaining shower and thunderstorm activity dissipated on August 22, the cyclone turned westward in response to the low-level easterly wind flow. Hector weakened to a tropical depression at 0000 UTC on August 23, and to a remnant low six hours later.

Hurricane Ioke

The cyclone developed from the Intertropical Convergence Zone on August 20 far to the south of Hawaii. Encountering warm waters, little wind shear, and well-defined outflow, Ioke intensified from a tropical depression to Category 4  status within 48 hours. Late on August 22 it rapidly weakened to Category 2 status before crossing over Johnston Atoll. Two days later favorable conditions again allowed for rapid strengthening, and Ioke attained Category 5 status on August 25 before crossing the International Date Line. At the time, its barometric pressure was estimated at 915 mbar, thus becoming the strongest hurricane on record in the Central Pacific. Ioke gradually weakened as it turned northwestward and northward, and by September 6 it had transitioned into an extratropical cyclone. By then, the cyclone had lasted 19 days, reaching the equivalent of Category 5 status on the Saffir–Simpson hurricane scale three times. The remnants of Ioke accelerated northeastward and ultimately crossed into Alaska.

Ioke did not affect any permanently populated areas in the Central Pacific or Western Pacific basins as a hurricane or a typhoon. The hurricane left moderate damage on Wake Island totaling $88 million (2006 USD), which resulted from blown off roofs and damaged buildings, although the infrastructure of the island was left intact. All military personnel were evacuated from the island, the first full-scale evacuation of the island since Typhoon Sarah in 1967. Later, the extratropical remnants of Ioke produced a severe storm surge along the Alaskan coastline, causing beach erosion.<div style="clear:both">

Hurricane Ileana

A tropical wave exited the west coast of Africa on August 8, and entered the eastern Pacific on August 16. Three days later, a weak low-pressure area formed, and thunderstorms consolidated near that feature. A ridge over Mexico steered the system to the northwest through an area of warm waters and low wind shear. With favorable conditions, the depression quickly intensified into Tropical Storm Ileana. An eye formed in the center of the convection, and Ileana attained hurricane status late on August 22.

As Ileana was heading north along the Mexican coastline, slight rainfall was recorded along the coast, which caused some flooding in Nayarit, Jalisco, Colima, Michoacán, and Baja California Sur. High surf killed a man near Cabo San Lucas, despite warnings not to swim in the ocean. Despite forecasts of further intensification to Category 4 status, Ileana began weakening due to cooler waters. The thunderstorms waned, and the storm slowed its forward motion. On August 26, Ileana weakened to tropical storm status as convection decreased markedly. The next day, the storm deteriorated to tropical depression status, and later a remnant low after being devoid of thunderstorms.

Hurricane John

On August 28, a persistent area of low pressure southwest of Acapulco, Mexico developed into a tropical depression. Later that day it strengthened into a tropical storm, and it reached hurricane strength 24 hours later on August 29. John underwent rapid intensification and reached Category 3 intensity later that day and Category 4 on August 30. Hours later, the hurricane underwent another eyewall replacement cycle, and subsequently weakened to Category 3 status as it paralleled the Mexican coastline a short distance offshore. Potentially due to its eyewall replacement cycle or its interaction with land, John weakened to a 105 mph hurricane by late on August 31, but restrengthened to a major hurricane shortly after. It made landfall near the southern tip of the Baja California peninsula as a Category 2 hurricane on September 1. John continued northwestward along the eastern Baja California peninsula, weakening to tropical depression status by September 3 and dissipating on September 4 in the Gulf of California.

Along the southwestern coast of Mexico, John produced heavy surf, strong winds, and heavy rainfall, which flooded roads, caused mudslides, and downed trees. The heavy rainfall caused flooding, closed roads, and caused a dam to overflow. The winds and rainfall destroyed thousands of flimsy houses across the region. Across Mexico, five people were killed, and damage amounted to $663 million (2006 MXN, $60.8 million 2006 USD). Moisture from the remnants of John produced flooding across Texas, which closed a  portion of Interstate 10 in El Paso. In southern New Mexico, the rainfall caused widespread street flooding and some minor damage. Tropical moisture from the storm also produced rainfall in Arizona and southern California, where eight separate mudslides occurred, trapping 19 vehicles but causing no injuries.

Hurricane Kristy

A tropical wave exited western Africa on August 13, which moved across the Atlantic over the next nine days before entering the eastern Pacific. With light wind shear and warm waters, the depression quickly strengthened into Tropical Storm Kristy as thunderstorms increased. The small hurricane tracked slowly northwestward at first due to a ridge to its north. An eye soon developed, signaling that Kristy intensified into a hurricane early on August 31, about 30 hours after forming. Soon after, wind shear increased due to the outflow of powerful Hurricane John to its east, and Kristy moved into an area of cooler waters and drier air. Hurricane forecast models anticipated a Fujiwhara effect, or an orbiting of two tropical cyclones, which would eventually result in Kristy being absorbed by Hurricane John.

On September 1, Kristy weakened to tropical storm status, by which time the ridge to its north forced the storm southeastward. On September 2, the circulation became exposed from the convection, and Kristy fell to tropical depression status. Thunderstorms reformed and persisted over the center on the next day. Kristy re-attained tropical storm status on September 4, although it soon fell back to tropical depression status. Another burst of thunderstorms warranted Kristy being upgraded to tropical storm status again on September 5; by that time, the wind shear decreased and the track moved over warmer waters. Kristy turned back to the west, falling again to tropical depression status on September 6, after thunderstorms decreased due to dry air. Two days later, it degenerated into a remnant low, which dissipated a day later. The remnant disturbance continued westward, and initially Kristy was believed to have developed into Tropical Depression Two-C in the central Pacific Ocean; however, post-season analysis concluded the systems were separate.

Hurricane Lane

The depression intensified in a favorable environment, and was upgraded to Tropical Storm Lane later that night. As it moved parallel to the Mexican coast it continued to strengthen and became a hurricane on September 15, and a major hurricane early the next day. Hurricane Lane reached peak winds of  before it made landfall on the coast of Sinaloa on September 16. It quickly weakened over land and dissipated on September 17.

Tropical Storm Lane produced heavy rainfall and high seas along the west coast of Mexico, including Acapulco where flood waters reached  in depth. The Acapulco airport also experienced flooding, though service was not interrupted. Throughout Mexico, the hurricane caused four deaths and $2.2 billion (2006 MXN, $203 million 2006 USD) in damage, half of which in Sinaloa where heavy crop damage was reported.

Tropical Storm Miriam

A disturbance associated with a northerly extension of the Intertropical Convergence Zone and a tropical wave developed a closed circulation on September 15. It moved northeastward due to the influence from nearby Hurricane Lane, and organized enough to be declared Tropical Depression Fourteen-E on September 16 while located about 500 miles southwest of Cabo San Lucas, Mexico. It quickly strengthened, and organized into Tropical Storm Miriam later that day. After turning more towards the north, Miriam weakened to tropical depression status, and on September 18 it degenerated to a remnant low. The remnant circulation turned to the northwest, then to the east, and dissipated on September 21 a short distance west of Baja California. No deaths are damage are associated with Miriam, and only one ship recorded winds of over tropical storm force near the center.

Tropical Depression Two-C

On September 19, an area of disturbed weather associated with the Intertropical Convergence Zone became sufficiently organized to be designated Tropical Depression Two-C. Initially, it was thought that the depression formed from the remnants of Kristy, although subsequent analysis confirmed they were two separate systems. Initially, the depression was in an area of favorable conditions, with little wind shear and warm waters. As a result, the CPHC predicted significant strengthening to at least hurricane status. Instead, a high-pressure system to its north increased wind shear over the depression, causing the convection to become removed from the center. The depression weakened into a remnant low on September 20, never reaching tropical storm status.

Tropical Depression Three-C

During September, El Niño conditions became established across the Pacific, which produced an area of warmer waters along the International Date Line. A few days after Tropical Depression Two-C dissipated, another area of disturbed weather formed, and although it was disorganized, it was also persistent. The CPHC initiated advisories on Tropical Depression Three-C on September 26 after a circulation was evident in the system. Strong wind shear prevented any development, and the system dissipated on September 27.

Tropical Storm Norman

Early in October, a low-pressure system began to organize to the west of the Mexican coast, and on October 9 it developed into Tropical Depression Fifteen-E. It strengthened into a tropical storm the next day, but strong wind shear and low sea-surface temperatures hindered development. Norman slowly began to weaken, and on October 11 it degenerated into a remnant low-pressure area. Turning eastward, the system combined with a new tropical disturbance off the southwest Mexican coast, and slowly began to reorganize. The system was re-designated a tropical depression on October 15 just south-southeast of Manzanillo, Colima, although within a few hours it again dissipated.

The rainfall caused flooding and mudslides around Acapulco, affecting 170 homes, of which 20 were destroyed. About  of crop fields sustained damage. Initially there were two people missing; however, a subsequent report indicated there were no casualties associated with the storm.

Tropical Storm Olivia

On September 18, a tropical wave exited Africa and later crossed into the eastern Pacific on September 29 without development. Convection increased in the Pacific along the wave axis, spawning a broad low-pressure area on October 5. Influenced by a high-pressure system, the depression drifted northward. On October 11, the convective activity diminished and Olivia weakened to tropical depression status. Olivia deteriorated into a remnant low on October 13. It moved towards the east-southeast, and on October 15 was absorbed into the remnants of Tropical Storm Norman. Olivia never affected land.

Tropical Depression Four-C

In the middle of October, the Intertropical Convergence Zone extended across the central Pacific Ocean, resembling an extension of the monsoon trough. An area of disturbed weather formed well to the southwest of Hawaii, organizing slowly for several days. Upon being classified, the depression was located in an unusual steering flow that caused it to track eastward. Due to the approach of an upper-level trough, it was expected to dissipate quickly from wind shear, although forecasters noted the possibility for the trough to provide an outflow channel, which might allow strengthening. On October 14, strong wind shear removed the convection completely from the center, and the system degenerated into a remnant low.

The remnant circulation continued slowly eastward, dissipating on October 16. Concurrently, the convection tracked northeastward ahead of the upper-level trough, which contributed to heavy rainfall and flooding on the island of Hawaii on October 17. The rainfall event coincided with the 2006 Kiholo Bay earthquake striking the area.

Hurricane Paul

Hurricane Paul developed from an area of disturbed weather on October 21, and slowly intensified as it moved into an area of warm waters and progressively decreasing wind shear. A strong trough turned the hurricane to the north and northeast into an area of strong vertical shear, and Paul weakened to a tropical storm on October 24, later passing just south of the Baja California Peninsula. Paul weakened to a tropical depression on October 25 a short distance off the coast of Mexico, and after briefly turning away from the coast it made landfall on northwestern Sinaloa on October 26.

Paul was the third hurricane to threaten western Mexico in the season, the others being Hurricanes John and Lane. Rough surf killed two people along Baja California Sur, while two deaths from flooding were reported in Sinaloa. Damage totaled more than $35 million (2006 MXN, $3.2 million 2006 USD).

Tropical Depression Eighteen-E

The origins of Tropical Depression Eighteen-E were from a tropical wave that exited the coast of Africa on October 7. It briefly spawned a low-pressure area as the wave continued westward without development. On October 20, the wave entered the Pacific Ocean, developing an area of thunderstorms about four days later. Initially, Tropical Depression Eighteen-E was located in an area of light wind shear, and the NHC anticipated further organization and strengthening to near hurricane status. The tropical depression initially maintained a steady westward motion away from the Mexican coastline, due to a ridge north of the cyclone. By October 17, convection had decreased, and the depression was not forecast to intensify as much. Possibly due to intrusion of dry air, the circulation became exposed from the thunderstorms, and having weakened, it turned to a southward drift. By 0000 UTC on October 28, the system had weakened to a non-convective remnant low, which dissipated the following day.

Tropical Storm Rosa

Environmental conditions appeared favorable, although wind shear removed the convection from the circulation. Throughout its duration, the storm maintained a northwest track through a weakness in a subtropical ridge. By November 9, a new area of convection persisted near the center, and a banding feature formed. Rosa remained a tropical storm for only 18 hours, becoming a tropical depression early on November 10 and dissipating later that day. Rosa was the first tropical storm in the basin to develop during November since 2000, and was also the first tropical depression to form in the month since 2002's Tropical Depression Sixteen-E. No impact was reported from the storm.

Tropical Depression Twenty-E

A tropical wave moved off the western coast of Africa on October 21, briefly developing two weak low-pressure areas before the wave crossed into the Pacific Ocean on November 1. Thunderstorm activity slowly increased as the wave interacted within the Intertropical Convergence Zone. Throughout its duration, the depression never completely separated from the Intertropical Convergence Zone. When the NHC issued its first advisory on the depression, the agency predicted slight intensification to tropical storm status and for the depression to last at least two days. This was due to a forecast of gradually increasing wind shear after the first 24 hours. Instead, the circulation became very elongated; it is estimated the cyclone degenerated into a trough by late on November 11.

Hurricane Sergio

Subsequently, it began to weaken due to increased wind shear as it turned to the north.

Sergio produced light rainfall along the coast of Mexico, though its effects were minimal. The formation of Sergio marked the 2006 season as the most active in 12 years and the second season in which more than one tropical storm formed in November, after 1961. Sergio set records for the month of November in the basin. At the time, it was considered the strongest hurricane to form in the month; although it has since dropped to third after Sandra from 2015, and Kenneth from 2011. It is however, still considered the longest-lived November Pacific tropical cyclone with a duration of seven days.

Other system

On October 28, 2006, a cut-off extratropical cyclone stalled over the northeast Pacific Ocean and began to strengthen. By October 31, the storm had acquired tropical characteristics, including an eye, convection, and a warmer-than-average core. The system reached peak intensity on November 1, before slowly weakening and looping towards the Pacific Northwest. The system made landfall in Washington state on November 3, before rapidly weakening and dissipating on the next day. During the duration of the storm, the system was known as Storm 91C (or INVEST 91C). The storm's true nature still remains controversial among meteorologists today, due to disputes over the storm's exact structure and whether or not it had obtained tropical or subtropical characteristics. Because the storm was not within the area of responsibility of the National Hurricane Center or the Central Pacific Hurricane Center, the storm was never assigned a name.

Storm names 

The following names were used for named storms that formed in the northeast Pacific in 2006. The same list was used in the 2000 season. There were no names retired from the northeast Pacific list. Therefore, the same list was reused in the 2012 season.

For storms that form in the Central Pacific Hurricane Center's area of responsibility, encompassing the area between 140 degrees west and the International Date Line, names are used in a series of four rotating lists. The next four names that were slated for use in 2006 are shown below, however only the name Ioke was used.

Retirement 
The name Ioke was retired from the north-central Pacific list by the World Meteorological Organization in the spring of 2007 and replaced with Iopa. During the 61st Interdepartmental Hurricane Conference, the Hawaii State Civil Defense requested the retirement of the name Daniel, citing that the storm had become memorable due to threat of damage. However, the request was denied, as the name remains on the tropical cyclone naming list.

Season effects 
This is a table of all the storms that formed in the 2006 Pacific hurricane season. It includes their duration, names, intensities, areas affected, damages, and death totals. Deaths in parentheses are additional and indirect (an example of an indirect death would be a traffic accident), but were still related to that storm. Damage and deaths include totals while the storm was extratropical, a wave, or a low, and all the damage figures are in 2006 USD.

See also 

 Tropical cyclones in 2006
 List of Pacific hurricanes
 Pacific hurricane season
 2006 Atlantic hurricane season
 2006 Pacific typhoon season
 2006 North Indian Ocean cyclone season
 South-West Indian Ocean cyclone seasons: 2005–06, 2006–07
 Australian region cyclone seasons: 2005–06, 2006–07
 South Pacific cyclone seasons: 2005–06, 2006–07

Notes

References

External links 

 National Hurricane Center's Eastern Pacific Tropical Weather Outlook – updated four times daily
 National Hurricane Center
 National Hurricane Center's 2006 Advisory Archive
 Central Pacific Hurricane Center

 
Pacific hurricane seasons
2006 Epac